The Bundang Line or Seoul Metropolitan Subway Bundang Line (Sudogwon Jeoncheol Bundangseon 수도권 전철 분당선) was a commuter rail line of the Seoul Metropolitan Subway in the Seoul Capital Area operated by Korail. Also it refers physical railway track from Wangsimni to Suwon which is designated by MOLIT. The name 'Bundang Line' refers to the fact that the line was originally constructed for the new planned town of Bundang. The line service started in central eastern Seoul at Cheongnyangni, crossing Gangnam District and connecting the cities of Seongnam and Yongin, and terminates at Suwon Station. While the track 'Bundang Line' designated by MOLIT is from Wangsimni to Suwon.

Service

Trains ran every 4~5 minutes during rush hours & every 7~8 minutes during off peak hours between Wangsimni and Jukjeon. Trains run at half the frequency between Jukjeon and Suwon, except during rush hours.

Most northbound trains terminated at Wangsimni. Some northbound trains continued one stop to Cheongnyangni, and the last few trains in the evening from Suwon terminated at Jukjeon. Half of all southbound trains head to Suwon, and the other half short-turn at Jukjeon. Express train service stopped at all stops between Wangsimni and Jukjeon, and thereafter at Giheung, Mangpo, Suwon City Hall and Suwon. The express service only operated during rush hours on weekdays.

History

Stations
The negative sign is only a convention for distance notation from Wangsimni Station, the terminus of most services.

Rolling Stock 
The Bundang Line used 43 Korail Class 351000 trains. Earlier trains were originally the same models used on Line 4, as they were all originally classified as Class 2000 trains. First generation trains (351-01~351-22) were introduced since the line's opening, second generation trains (351-23~351-28) were introduced when the Bundang Line was extended from Suseo to Seolleung in 2003, and third generation trains (351-29~351-43) were introduced as more extensions open.

References

See also

Bundang-gu
Rapid transit in South Korea
Korail
Seoul Metropolitan Subway

 
Seoul Metropolitan Subway lines
Railway lines in South Korea
Railway lines opened in 1994
Transport in Seoul
Transport in Gyeonggi Province